Yanzhou railway station is a first-class railway station in Yanzhou District, Jining, Shandong, which serves three railways: Yanzhou–Shijiusuo railway, Beijing–Shanghai railway, and Xinxiang–Yanzhou railway. The station was built in July 1907, completed in August 1911 and has been operated since then. The total area of the waiting room is more than 3,400 square meters. The station has an average daily passenger flow of more than 10,000 people.

References

Railway stations in Jining
Stations on the Yanzhou–Shijiusuo railway
Railway stations in China opened in 1907
Stations on the Beijing–Shanghai Railway
Stations on the Xinxiang–Yanzhou railway